El secreto de la monja ("The Secret of the Nun") is a 1940 Mexican film. It stars Carlos Orellana.

External links
 

1940 films
1940s Spanish-language films
Mexican black-and-white films
Mexican fantasy drama films
1940s fantasy drama films
1940 drama films
1940s Mexican films